DZVT (1395 AM) Radyo Totoo is a radio station owned and operated by the Apostolic Vicariate of San Jose. The station's studio and transmitter are located in Brgy. Labangan Poblacion, San Jose, Occidental Mindoro.

Last October 26, 2011, the place, which houses DZVT & Spirit FM, was burned by unidentified men.

References

Radio stations established in 1991
Radio stations in Mindoro
Catholic radio stations